Torynorrhina hyacinthina is a beetle  of the family Scarabaeidae and subfamily Cetoniinae.

Distribution
This flower beetle can be found from  India to Thailand.

References

Cetoniinae
Beetles described in 1841